Only in America with Larry the Cable Guy is an American travel documentary series that aired for three seasons from 2011 to 2013 on History. It premiered on February 8, 2011.

Premise
In the series, Larry the Cable Guy travels America and experiences a variety of different life styles that occur "only in America" – the comedian explores the country, immersing himself in different lifestyles, jobs and hobbies.

Each episode starts with Larry saying:

Episodes

Season 1 (2011)

Season 2 (2012)

Season 3 (2013)

References

External links
 
 

2010s American reality television series
2011 American television series debuts
2013 American television series endings
English-language television shows
History (American TV channel) original programming